"Mishipeshu" is the 18th episode of season 4 of the supernatural drama television series Grimm  and the 84th episode overall, which premiered on April 10, 2015, on the cable network NBC. The episode was written by Alan DiFiore and was directed by Omar Madha.

Plot

Opening quote: "The Spirit you seek in the water is only a reflection of yourself."

Nick (David Giuntoli) and Hank (Russell Hornsby) newest investigation is on a homicide in the dark and mysterious path of a local Native American "vision quest" involved mishipeshu (underwater Panther). Juliette's (Bitsie Tulloch) errant behavior lands her in trouble with the wrong side of the law. Monroe (Silas Weir Mitchell) and Rosalee (Bree Turner) are on mission with Captain Renard's (Sasha Roiz) assistance. Hank falls prey to a Native American's spirit with yellow eyes.

Reception

Viewers
The episode was viewed by 4.54 million people, earning a 1.0/4 in the 18-49 rating demographics on the Nielson ratings scale, ranking third on its timeslot and sixth for the night in the 18-49 demographics, behind Dateline NBC, The Amazing Race, Last Man Standing, 20/20, and Shark Tank. This was a 5% decrease in viewership from the previous episode, which was watched by 4.76 million viewers with a 1.1/4. This means that 1.0 percent of all households with televisions watched the episode, while 4 percent of all households watching television at that time watched it. With DVR factoring in, the episode was watched by 6.81 million viewers and had a 1.8 ratings share in the 18-49 demographics.

Critical reviews
"Mishipeshu" received positive reviews. Les Chappell from The A.V. Club gave the episode a "B−" rating and wrote, "'Mishipeshu' is one of those occasional episodes of Grimm that decides to produce a story far outside their typical mythology scope. While the show is steeped in magic and the supernatural, most of what happens obeys a certain set of rules, few of which can't be explained by a visit to the all-knowing Airstream or the ever helpful spice shop. Every so often though, the writers will introduce something that states there are more things in heaven and earth than are dreamt of in your philosophy, beings whose nature defies categorization even to the Grimms. Season two's 'La Llorona' and 'Volcanalis' are prime examples, where the creature encountered is not what you'd identify as typical Wesen and whose origins remain in the realm of myth even after the story's resolution."

Kathleen Wiedel from TV Fanatic, gave a 3.5 star rating out of 5, stating: "Native American lore abounds with rich material for a show like Grimm to work with, so I'm a bit surprised it took them this long to visit something like this, with a spirit being possessing a young man to take vengeance on the men who killed his father. The titular Mishipeshu of Grimm Season 4 Episode 18 isn't a Wesen; it falls under the same unexplained, "other" category as Volcanalis and La Llorona."

MaryAnn Sleasman from TV.com, wrote, "'Mishipeshu' was one of those episodes that further fleshed out Nick's world and reminded us that not all weirdness is the work of a Wesen or two. A Native American boy named Simon came of age and found himself stuck in the position of hosting the mythical Mishipeshu, which probably wouldn't have been so bad if it didn't result in him waking up in the woods, covered in someone else's blood. That it was the blood of his father's unpunished murderers added an element of justification to the whole thing, but still — not a great situation to be in."

Christine Horton of Den of Geek wrote, "Grimms writers prefer to drip-feed us clues about character development or plot over several episodes, or even seasons, presumably favouring a slow build of anticipation over real momentum. We have come to accept this, despite some storylines feeling laboriously drawn-out, and others paid lip service seemingly only when the writers remember them. (anyone seen Nick ‘grey-out’ lately?) Perhaps one of the problems lies in the fact that it is a 22-episode season, which is an awfully long time to maintain momentum. (Den of Geek rightly points out that series that attract the most acclaim – True Detective for example – are far tighter, have fewer episodes, and are scheduled in one run.)"

References

External links
 

Grimm (season 4) episodes
2015 American television episodes